Matehuala is the second most important city in the Mexican state of San Luis Potosí. Matehuala is also the municipal seat of the municipality of the same name, located in the northern part of the state, on the border with the southwestern corner of Nuevo León. The city of Matehuala population is of 176,876.

Government

Municipal presidents

Notable people
Juan José Ortega - film director and producer (1904–1996)

Notable buildings
 Immaculate Conception Cathedral, Matehuala has the same architectural style as the Church of Saint Joseph des Brotteaux, in Lyon, France. Its construction started in 1898 and was never finished.
 Iglesia Santísima de Guadalupe

See also
Immaculate Conception Cathedral, Matehuala

References

External links
Gobierno Municipal de Matehuala Official website
www.portalmatehuala.com
www.matehuala.com.mx
Pagina Oficial de la Delegación D-II-86 Matehuala
Link to tables of population data from Census of 2005 INEGI: Instituto Nacional de Estadística, Geografía e Informática
San Luis Potosí Enciclopedia de los Municipios de México

Populated places in San Luis Potosí